Jericho is a British period crime drama series, first broadcast as a series of four episodes on ITV from 16 October 2005. The series was written and created by Stewart Harcourt, and starred Robert Lindsay as Detective Inspector Michael Jericho, a Scotland Yard detective who is loved by the public but embarrassed by his status as a hero. Because of his fame, a TV series, based on his career, is in development, paralleling the real-life TV series Fabian of the Yard which fictionalized the career of Scotland Yard detective Robert Fabian. 
The series is set in London in 1958. The series was seen as an attempt to exploit ITV's success in period crime drama, best exemplified by Foyle's War, and to rival the BBC's staple dramas such as Waking the Dead.

The first episode drew in 5.9 million viewers, but this quickly fell to 4.7 million for the second episode, significantly less than its BBC rival. Critical response to the series was cautious, and a second series was not commissioned. The series was later shown in the United States in 2006 and 2007 under the title Jericho of Scotland Yard as part of the PBS Mystery! series, and was also broadcast by the Australian Broadcasting Corporation in 2008.

Synopsis
Detective Inspector Michael Jericho is the son of an English policeman who returned from World War I a violent and changed man. Young Jericho witnessed his father shot and killed in his own front hall by two gunmen. In his father's right hand was his pocket watch, which Jericho now keeps with him constantly. In the series, Jericho carries on a private feud with a local crime boss, whom Jericho believes, but cannot prove, either brought about his father's death or knew who had him killed; the boss in turn has suborned a thuggish Scotland Yard Inspector named Christie to hound Jericho by planting scandal sheets under his nose about his father being a "corrupt policeman" or by implying Jericho has a less than professional relationship with his downstairs neighbour – a French prostitute. Jericho's mother is still alive, although they are only seen meeting in the cemetery on the anniversary of his father's death.

Jericho served in World War II. Besides his off again-on again relationship with his downstairs neighbour, he is a workaholic who sleeps poorly. He has a faithful secretary, a tough sergeant, a younger DI assistant, and, as comic relief, an informer who is a street fence. The last episode, "The Hollow Men", features in-jokes about the TV industry: a director replaces Jericho with a comic actor, starring as Jericho in a fictionalized series of Jericho's Scotland Yard cases; at a banquet meeting of police widows and orphans, Christie tries to get Jericho as the master of ceremonies after guest speaker Benny Hill has cancelled.

Cast
 Robert Lindsay as DI Michael Jericho
 David Troughton as Sgt Clive Harvey 
 Ciarán McMenamin as DC John Caldicott
 Nicholas Jones as AC Graham Cherry
 Kellie Bright as WPC Penny Collins 
 Eve Matheson as Rita Harvey 
 Lee Ross as Louis Jackson
 Lydia Leonard as Angela 
 Aurélie Bargème as Juliette
 Brendan Coyle as Christie

Episodes
Three of the four episode titles are derived from poems by T. S. Eliot. "A Pair of Ragged Claws" is quoted from a book of Eliot poetry owned by the mistress of a murder victim in that episode. In "To Murder and Create", a murder victim has the name "Thomas Stearns Eliot". Both are lines from "The Love Song of J. Alfred Prufrock". "The Hollow Men" is also the title of Eliot's poem from 1925.

References

External links 
 

2000s British drama television series
2005 British television series debuts
2005 British television series endings
Television series by ITV Studios
British detective television series
2000s British television miniseries
Television shows produced by Granada Television
English-language television shows
2000s British crime television series
ITV mystery shows